This is an incomplete list of music festivals held yearly in Estonia:

See also
List of festivals in Estonia

References

 
Music
Estonia
Estonia